Hymenobacter rivuli is a bacterium from the genus of Hymenobacter which has been isolated from water from the Wanan Creek in Taiwan.

References 

rivuli
Bacteria described in 2018